McHatton is a surname. Notable people with the surname include:

Robert L. McHatton (1788–1835), American politician
Todd McHatton, American singer, songwriter, musician, performer, artist, and puppeteer

English-language surnames